Karmen is both a surname and a given name. Notable people with the name include:

Surname:
Roman Karmen (1906–1978), Soviet war camera-man and film director
Steve Karmen (born 1937), American composer

Given name:
Karmen Sunčana Lovrić (born 1986), Croatian actress
Karmen Mar (born 1987), Slovenian chess player
Karmen McNamara (born 1983), Canadian triathlete
Karmen Pedaru (born 1990), Estonian fashion model
Karmen Stavec (born 1973), Slovene singer

See also

Carmen (given name)
Carmen (surname)
Karien